Su Nü Jing or Su Nü Ching - Classic of the White Madam (素女經), is the basic book of Taoist sexology, China's Chinese classics on Taoist sexual practices. The book was written before the Han dynasty, and it is said that the author was the Goddess Sunü in the Huang Di era.

In China this book was lost after Tang dynasty (~907 AD). However, copies of the text were collected in Japan by Tamba Yasara (丹波康赖), who included this book in his series of books "Heart of Medicine" (医心方) (published in 982 AD), and the current edition of "Su Nu Jing" is the taken from the collection of Yasara.

Supposedly there were three goddesses in the era of Huangdi, namely Sunü, Xuannü and Cainü; the three sisters taught the Huangdi Taoist sexual practices the theory of sex and practiced physically with him, among them, Sunü was good at music and is the author of "Su Nu Jing". 

The whole book can be divided into two parts. One part talks about the methods of sexual intercourse. There are 24 tricks in "Seven Losses", "Eight Benefits" and "Nine Methods"; the other parts are about flirting skills, Five Signs, Five Desires, and Ten Movements. The explanations for both men and women are very straightforward.

This book mainly is about Taoist sexual practices and health precautions. It teaches sex position, skills, seasons and sex, psychology, pregnancy method, sexology theory and many other connotations. Among them, "philharmonic" is mentioned, and it is advocated that both men and women shall agree to make love, otherwise it is harmful to the body.

References

External links
Su Nu Ching, （Classic of the White Madam）
中醫大典－《醫心方》〈卷第二十八至理第一〉〈卷第二十八養陽第二〉Wisdom of Chinese Medicine Traditional Chinese Medicine Classics-"Heart-Heart Prescription" (Volume 28 to Li No. 1) (Volume 28 to Yang Yang No. 2)

Taoist practices
Sexology